Ghale is a Sino-Tibetan dialect cluster of Nepal that may be part of the Tamangic family. The people who speak them are ethnically Tamang, but their languages are too poorly known to be sure. The two languages, Kutang (Bihi, Chak, Rana) and Ghale (Barpak, Kyaura, Laprak, Khorla, Uiya, Jagat, Philim, Nyak), might each be considered more than one language.

References

 George van Driem (2001) Languages of the Himalayas: An Ethnolinguistic Handbook of the Greater Himalayan Region. Brill.

Tamangic languages
Languages of Nepal